This page is a list of mayors of Toulouse since 1790.

The municipal law of 14 December 1789 created a General Council of the municipality of Toulouse whose eighteen members were elected for two years by the citizens. The first mayor was Joseph de Rigaud, 70 years old at that time, and a professor at the Faculty of Law. He took office on 28 February 1790. Previously, it was the elected Capitouls who ran the city until their city council was suppressed.

18th century

19th century

Since 1901

See also 
 Municipal council (France)
 Municipal elections in France

References

External links
 Mayors of Toulouse (in French)
 Association of the mayors of France

Toulouse
Mayors of Toulouse
Politics of France